The Dadin Kowa Dam is situated in Yamaltu Deba local government area of Gombe State in the North east part of Nigeria.
The dam is located about 37 kilometers to the east of Gombe town and 5 km from Dadin kowa village, and provides drinking water for the town. The dam was completed by the federal government in 1984, with the goal of providing irrigation and electricity for the planned Gongola sugar plantation project.

Description
The reservoir which is designed to have a water capacity of 2.8 billion cubic meters making it the 2nd largest dam  in the countryas and a surface area of 300 square kilometers, and has potential as a source of fish.
26,000 people were displaced by the reservoir, receiving little assistance for resettlement.
The reservoir is suspected to be a major breeding site for black flies, which cause river blindness.

The water supply project was built at a cost of about N8.2billion by CGC Nigeria, a Chinese company, completed during the administration of Governor Mohammed Danjuma Goje. In 2010 it was providing about 30,000 cubic meters daily, treated at a plant three kilometers from the dam before being piped to storage reservoirs in Gombe while supplying communities along the road.

In August 2001 the federal government announced that it would spend $32 million to complete the Dadin Kowa Dam power generation facilities.
In March 2009 N7 billion was allocated to complete the hydro-electrical generation component of the dam, and another N500 million to complete the canal, which would irrigate 6,600 hectares of farmland.
In August 2009 Governor Goje said that less than N600 million was needed to provide the canals.

After prioritization by the government for completion of the project in 2016, the ministry concluded completion of the dam in August 2021. As of September 2021, the Ministry of Power hadn't enabled full use of energy from the dam as part of the grid.

References

Dams in Nigeria
Gombe State
Dams completed in 1984
1984 establishments in Nigeria
20th-century architecture in Nigeria